The Ambassador of the United Kingdom to Syria was the United Kingdom's foremost diplomatic representative to Syria, and head of the UK's diplomatic mission in Damascus. The official title was His Britannic Majesty's Ambassador to the Syrian Arab Republic.

In February 2012 all diplomatic staff were withdrawn from the British Embassy in Damascus and its services were suspended. There is now no ambassador. The UK appoints a "Special Envoy to Syria"; the present incumbent is the head of the Near East Department at the Foreign & Commonwealth Office in London.

Heads of mission

Envoy Extraordinary and Minister Plenipotentiary to the Syrian and Lebanese Republics
1942–1944: Edward Spears
1944–1946: Terence Shone

Envoy Extraordinary and Minister Plenipotentiary at Damascus
1947: Patrick Scrivener
1947–1950: Philip Broadmead
1950–1952: William Montagu-Pollock

Ambassador Extraordinary and Plenipotentiary to the Syrian Arab Republic
1952–1953: William Montagu-Pollock
1953–1957: John Gardener
1958–1961: Syria joined with Egypt in the United Arab Republic
1962–1964: Thomas Bromley
1964–1967: Trefor Evans
1967–1973: Diplomatic relations broken off due to the Six-Day War
1973–1976: David Roberts
1976–1979: James Craig
1979–1981: Patrick Wright
1982–1984: Ivor Lucas
1984–1986: Roger Tomkys
1986–1991: Diplomatic relations broken off following the Hindawi affair
1991–1994: Andrew Green
1994–1996: Adrian Sindall
1996–2000: Basil Eastwood
2000–2003: Henry Hogger
2003–2006: Peter Ford
2006–2007: John Jenkins
2007–2012: Simon Collis

2012: Ambassador withdrawn – embassy closed

UK Special Envoy to Syria
2014: Jonathan Wilks (2012–2013: UK Special Envoy to the Syrian opposition)
2014–2017: Gareth Bayley
2017–2020: Martin Longden
2020–: Jonathan Hargreaves

References

External links
Syria and the UK, gov.uk

Syria
United Kingdom